Jamie Frederic Metzl (born July 1, 1968) is an American geopolitical commentator, author, and government and nonprofit executive and advisor. He is the author of five books, including the science fiction novels, Genesis Code and Eternal Sonata, and the non-fiction work, Hacking Darwin: Genetic Engineering and the Future of Humanity. In 2004, he ran unsuccessfully against former Kansas City Mayor Emanuel Cleaver for the Democratic nomination for Missouri's Fifth Congressional District.

He has served as executive vice president of the Asia Society.

Metzl served the Clinton administration as director for multilateral and humanitarian affairs for the National Security Council, working for the Clinton administration in the United States Department of State as senior advisor to the undersecretary for public diplomacy and public affairs and information technology and senior coordinator for international public information, and was also deputy staff director of the Senate Foreign Relations Committee under then Senator Joe Biden.

Early life and education
He was born to Marilyn Metzl, a clinical psychologist, and Kurt Metzl, a pediatrician. He attended high school at The Barstow School in Kansas City, Missouri. He is a magna cum laude and Phi Beta Kappa graduate of Brown University. He holds a Ph.D. in Southeast Asian history from Oxford University (1994), and a J.D. from Harvard Law School.

Career 
Metzl served as deputy staff director and senior counselor of the United States Senate Committee on Foreign Relations, senior coordinator for international public information and senior advisor to the undersecretary for public diplomacy and public affairs at the Department of State, and director of multilateral and humanitarian affairs on the National Security Council. In the Clinton administration, he was the primary drafter of Presidential Decision Directive 68 on International Public Information and coordinated public information campaigns for Iraq and Kosovo. From 1991 to 1993, Metzl was a human rights officer for the United Nations Transitional Authority in Cambodia (UNTAC), where he helped establish a human rights investigation and monitoring unit for Cambodia.

In 2003, Metzl directed a Council on Foreign Relations study led by Warren B. Rudman that concluded that the United States was not doing enough to prepare first responders to handle a catastrophic attack. He appeared on Meet the Press, discussing the topic.

Metzl is a senior fellow at the Atlantic Council, and a former partner at the global investment company Cranemere LLC,.  Formerly, he was the executive vice president of the Asia Society. He developed and led the Asia Society's Asia 21 Young Leaders Initiative, a Pan-Asia-Pacific leadership development program.

He has been featured as a commentator in the American and international media, including BBC, CNN, Bloomberg, and Fox News Channel. He authored a book on human rights in Southeast Asia and the novel The Depths of the Sea, and his writing has been published in The New York Times, Foreign Affairs, among other publications. He is a member of the Council on Foreign Relations, and a former White House Fellow, Aspen Institute Crown Fellow, and French-American Foundation Young Leader. He is a founder and co-chairman of bipartisan  national security NGO the Partnership for a Secure America, has served on the board of the Jewish refugee organization HIAS, the International Center for Transitional Justice, and the Brandeis University International Center for Ethics, Justice and Public Life, and the Philippines.

He is the former chairman of the international advisory committee to the Mongolian Ministry of Nature, Environment, and Tourism and the former is honorary ambassador to North America of the Korean Ministry of Trade, Industry, and Energy.

Personal life
He has completed 13 Ironman triathlons, 30 marathons, and 15 ultramarathons.

For the Brown Alumni Magazine, Metzl wrote a 2010 article describing the "narcissistic pleasure" he derived from having a Wikipedia page and how he asked an assistant to "occasionally add a link to the site".

Profiles 
아시아 차세대 리더들, 한국서 배울 점 많아 (Chosun Ilbo, November 2006)  
A Modern Day Renaissance Man Shares Lessons on Happiness, Habits, and Health (Huffington Post, December 2014)
Polymath Jamie Metzl on AI, Genetics, and the Future (Psychology Today, November 2018)

Works

Jamie Frederic Metzl (2014) Genesis Code, Arcade.   
Jamie Frederic Metzl (2016) Eternal Sonata, Arcade. ASIN: B01HDVCR4U
Jamie Frederic Metzl (April 2019) Hacking Darwin: Genetic Engineering and the Future of Humanity, Sourcebooks.

References

External links 
Jamie Metzl Personal Website
Jamie Metzl ICTJ Board profile
Jamie Metzl Asia Society officer profile

American foreign policy writers
American technology writers
American science fiction writers
21st-century American non-fiction writers
21st-century American novelists
Clinton administration personnel
Missouri Democrats
Henry Crown Fellows
Brown University alumni
Harvard Law School alumni
Alumni of the University of Oxford
American male novelists
Novelists from Missouri
People from the Kansas City metropolitan area
Living people
21st-century American male writers
1968 births